Oleg Frish is a Russian entertainer, singer, actor, television and radio personality, journalist, music historian, and is the Owner of New Age Media. Oleg was born in Zaporizhia, USSR into a family of musicians. His mother, Svetlana Frish, is a pianist and his father, Eugeny Frish, was longtime head of the children’s choir and an important member of the artistic community.

Life and career in Russia 
At the age of 16, Oleg entered Tver State University and also went into entertainment. Among his first jobs, was that of a "singing psychic." As part of his act, he would guess what songs people in the audience were thinking about, and then he would sing them. In 1980, his "musical mind reading" skills lead to national recognition  and in 1985 he received accreditation from one of the Soviet Union’s top cultural institutions, the Ministry of Culture of the USSR.

Oleg Frish sings in 24 different languages including Russian, English, Ukrainian, Japanese, Spanish, Polish, Hebrew, Yiddish and Yugoslavian.

In 1978, he moved to Moscow, where from 1978 to 1992 he was the writer for Soviet Variety and Circus magazine, a prominent performing arts magazine that covered the fields of music, variety and circus. He wrote such compositions including: The world in three minutes, A wonderful gift, "Psychological Experiments" - what is it? Art or trash?, Somewhere in this world, I can see how the planet spins, In a country which calls upon the distance, and We recorded time period.

In 1984, he earned induction into the Soviet branch of the International Brotherhood of Magicians.

In 1989, he earned a degree in the History of Variety and Cultural Arts from The National Research Institute of Arts Studies  and developed an interest in promoting Russian "stars of the past". He then toured domestically and internationally, lecturing on show biz history to students and the general public, and gained a reputation as an expert in this area of study.

In 2000 and in 2004, he was officially recognized in the All-Russian Encyclopedia of Variety,  which dedicated an article to his accomplishments for his work as historian and lecturer throughout Russia.

Career in USA 
In 1992, as the Cold War barriers were eased, Oleg Frish decided to move to the New York area, because at that time New York City was by far the biggest metropolitan entry point for Russian-speaking émigrés, especially Brighton Beach, Staten Island and Brooklyn.

In 1996, he became writer and host of the radio series "Walking The Streets of Moscow" for WMNB in Fort Lee, NJ, interviewing a wide variety of Russian-born entertainers including such Russian notables as Tatiana Samoilova, Elena Kamburova, Alla Pugacheva, Iosif Kobzon, Irina Ponarovskaya, Tamara Miansarova, Natalya Varley, Natalia Kustinskaya and many others who are celebrities for the Russian-American community. He also interviewed American singers, musicians and actors on The People’s Wave Radio 930AM in New York.

In 2002, NTV America, the leading Russian-language television channel, which combines the programming content of its sister network NTV Russia and original local programs from America, began broadcasting in Fort Lee, NJ.

In 2005, Oleg Frish became the Executive Producer of "Time Out", a Russian-language weekly television news and entertainment program that broadcast their first episode on May 15, 2005, on NTV America. In 2006, Oleg Frish also became the show’s host.

TIME OUT  - Oleg Frish was the Executive Producer and the Host of 121 episodes broadcast from 2005 to 2010 on NTV – a leading Russian TV Channel with headquarters in the US, broadcasting to 19 countries and reaching millions of people including the five million Russians living in the US. The program reviewed a variety of different topics including music business, pop-culture facts, interesting activities and unique locations, celebrity news and interviews and offered reviews of new releases of CDs, DVDs, upcoming movies and concert tours. Such celebrities as B.B. King, James Brown, Whoopi Goldberg, Claudia Schiffer, Paul Anka, Connie Francis, Neil Sedaka, composers John Kander, Jerry Herman and Johnny Mandel, Vikki Carr, Petula Clark, Yma Sumac, Shirley Jones, Keely Smith, Anita O'Day, Gloria Gaynor, Engelbert Humperdinck, Donna Summer and many others appeared on the show's 360+ segments.

Oleg Frish had the honor of interviewing the legendary James Brown on Time Out episode#34 that aired on August 27, 2006, just 4 months prior to James Brown's death on December 25, 2006.

James Brown quoted: "Oleg remembers the songs I did, but I’ve forgotten a long time ago".

Oleg currently hosts "Standard Time" Saturdays from 5:00-6:00PM on WNYM-970AM in Metropolitan New York.

2016 marks the twentieth anniversary of Oleg's status as a television personality in the United States.

Recordings 
Oleg Frish's first album "Hello from Brighton" was recorded in 1991 and released in Moscow. In 1998, "Strange Love", the second album, was released in New York.

In 2010, Oleg recorded his first English-language album "Bring Me Sunshine", as his tribute to "The Great American Songbook". The album has Oleg’s vocals and arrangements by a big band leader Patrick Williams (a late period Frank Sinatra recording associate) and sound engineering by Al Schmitt, whose 60-year career yielded 150 gold and platinum albums, 20 Grammy awards and who also recorded Ol' Blue Eyes. "Bring Me Sunshine" was produced at the legendary Capitol Records studios  in Hollywood, CA. 
Songwriter, Charles Strouse quoted: "The Great American Songbook, to which I am proud to be a contributor, is one of our greatest cultural exports, Oleg is a living example of what an impact this export has had. Far, far away, in the old Soviet Union where he grew up, he heard these songs and fell in love. It took him a while to record them but I know it's been one of his lifelong dreams."

In 2014, Oleg finished the recording of his new CD "Oleg Frish and His American Idols", a set of duets with iconic American singers who were guests on his TV and Radio shows and now have recorded American classics with him - Bobby Rydell, Melissa Manchester, Ben E. King, Peggy March, Lainie Kazan, Tony Orlando, B.J. Thomas, Lou Christie and Gary U.S. Bonds. The album was recorded at the Deep Diner Music Co. in New York in November 2014. The album is introduced by Connie Francis and was released in 2015.

Oleg Frish still performs on stage, touring with the Bring Me Sunshine cabaret act with performances in New York at the Metropolitan Room among other venues.

References

External links 
ReverbNation - Oleg Frish Stats & Brooklyn, NY Jazz Chart Position

The Peoples.RU – "Oleg Frish: THE MAN SHOW-BIZ" (translated)
Sounds of Timeless Jazz Interview – Paula Edelstein interviews Oleg Frish
The Buffalo News 1/21/2011 – Review of Oleg Frish: Bring Me Sunshine
Oleg Frish - our man at NBC (translated) 10/08/2001
RUNYweb.com Who does not know Frish? (translated) 01/09/2004
TIME OUT Celebrity Interview Archives (James Brown, Gloria Gaynor, B.B. King, Connie Francis, Shirley Jones, Yma Sumac, Neil Sedaka, etc.)

Russian male stage actors
Russian entertainers
Russian journalists
20th-century Russian male singers
20th-century Russian singers
Russian radio personalities
Russian television personalities
Music historians
Living people
Articles containing video clips
Year of birth missing (living people)
Russian emigrants to the United States
20th-century births